United States v. Jicarilla Apache Nation, 564 U.S. 162 (2011), is a United States Supreme Court case in which the Court held that the fiduciary exception to attorney–client privilege does not apply to the general trust relationship between the United States and Indian tribes.

Background 
In 2001, the Jicarilla Apache Nation sued the federal government for breach of trust, claiming that the United States government had mismanaged the financial interests and funds held in trust for the tribe. The tribe sought access to attorney-client communications about the trust operation. The Court of Federal Claims (CFC) granted this motion in part, holding that the documents fell within the fiduciary exception to attorney-client privilege. 

The Federal Circuit Court of Appeals agreed with the CFC, claiming that the trust relationship between the Jicarilla Apache Nation and the United States government was sufficiently similar to a private trust. As such, they argued, the federal government's fiduciary obligation was greater than the attorney-client privilege.

Opinion of the Court 
The Court, in an opinion penned by Justice Alito, overturned the lower courts' rulings, and held that the fiduciary exception to attorney-client privilege does not apply to the trust relationship between the United States and Indian tribes. The government's trust obligations to the tribe are primarily established through statute, not federal law. Additionally, the Court argued, the United States acts not as a traditional trustee would act--obligated to the interests of its beneficiary--but instead as a sovereign within its rights to execute federal law towards its own interests.

References

External links
 

2011 in United States case law
United States Supreme Court cases
United States Supreme Court cases of the Roberts Court
United States Native American case law
United States attorney–client privilege case law